Christmas in PR is an annual wrestling event promoted in Puerto Rico by the International Wrestling Association (IWA-PR). It was also briefly held by the World Wrestling League (WWL) during the former's period of inactivity.

It is held every December as the Puerto Rican wrestling year's-end show. IWA held most of its events on weekends visiting various cities around Puerto Rico, the main night of the tour would be held Saturdays most of the times in Bayamón, Puerto Rico

WWF/IWA Christmas in PR 1999
The 1999 inaugural IWA Christmas in PR was held at two locations: At the Roberto Clemente Coliseum in San Juan, Puerto Rico on December 15, 1999 and at Edwin "Puruco" Nolazco Coliseum in Coamo, Puerto Rico on December 16, 1999

IWA Christmas in PR 2000
The 2000 event was held at three locations: On December 15 at the Acropolis de Manati in Manatí, Puerto Rico, On December 16 at Cancha Pepin Cestero in Bayamón, Puerto Rico and On December 17, in Guayama, Puerto Rico

IWA Christmas in PR 2001
The 2001 event was held at Cancha Pepín Cestero in Bayamón, Puerto Rico on December 15, 2001 and other unknown locations.

IWA Christmas in PR 2002
The 2002 event was held at four different locations: (presumably) On December 12, 2002 in Manatí, Puerto Rico, (presumably) On December 13, 2002 in Cayey, Puerto Rico, On December 14, 2002 at "Guillermo Angulo Coliseum" in Carolina, Puerto Rico and On December 15, 2002 in San Germán, Puerto Rico.

IWA Christmas in PR 2003
The 2003 event was held at the "Rubén Rodríguez Coliseum" in Bayamón, Puerto Rico on December 13, 2003 and other unknown locations

IWA Christmas in PR 2004
The 2004 event was held at two different locations: on December 17, 2006 at "Juan Pachín Vicens Auditorium" in Ponce, Puerto Rico and on December 9, 2006 at "Cancha Pepín Cestero" in Bayamón, Puerto Rico

IWA Christmas in PR 2005
The 2005 event was held at the Pepín Cestero Court in Bayamón, Puerto Rico on December 17, 2005.

Golden Boy & Super Mark defeated Spectro & Exxus
Intercontinental Champion Noriega defeated Mr. Big 
Tag Team Champions Neo & Montana defeated (La Cruzz del Diablo) El Diabólico & Cruzz
Hardcore Champion Slash Venom defeated Trailer Park Trash 
Chicano vs Heavyweight Champion Savio Vega with Invader #1 as special referee went to no contest
Ray González defeated Apolo
Junior Heavyweight Champion Carlitos defeated Hiram Tua, Tommy Diablo & Blitz in a Fatal Four Way Match 
Thunder & Lightning defeated Ricky Banderas & Vampiro

IWA Christmas in PR 2006
The 2006 event was held at four different locations: on December 7, 2006 at "Acrópolis de Manatí" in Manatí, Puerto Rico, On December 8, 2006 at "Polideportivo Los Caobos" in Ponce, Puerto Rico, On December 9, 2006 at "Cancha Pepín Cestero" in Bayamón, Puerto Rico and on December 10 at "Coliseo de San Sebastián" in San Sebastián, Puerto Rico.

IWA Christmas in PR 2007
The 2007 event was held at two different locations: On December 15, 2007 at "Cancha Pepín Cestero" in Bayamón, Puerto Rico and on December 16, 2007 at "Dr. Pedro Albizu Campos Coliseum" in Yabucoa, Puerto Rico.

IWA Christmas in PR 2008
The 2008 event was held at two different locations: On December 12, 2008 at "Raul Pipote Oliveras Coliseum" in Yauco, Puerto Rico and on December 13, 2008 at "Cancha Pepín Cestero" in Bayamón, Puerto Rico.

IWA Christmas in PR 2009
The 2009 event was held at two different locations: On December 11, 2009 at "Raul Pipote Oliveras Coliseum" in Yauco, Puerto Rico and on December 12, 2009 at "Cancha Pepín Cestero" in Bayamón, Puerto Rico.

IWA Christmas in PR 2010
The 2010 event was held at two different locations: On December 3, 2010 at "Cancha de la Ponderosa" in Vega Baja, Puerto Rico and on December 5, 2010 at "Cancha Pepín Cestero" in Bayamón, Puerto Rico.

WWL Christmas in PR 2016

The World Wrestling League (WWL) brought back Christmas in PR in 2016, being the second historical IWA event to be hosted by the promotion, after Golpe de Estado. The event was held at the José "Pepín" Cestero Complex in Bayamón, Puerto Rico on December 17, 2016.

IWA Christmas in PR 2019
The return of the event to its home promotion is scheduled to take place at Coliseo Lauro Dávila in Toa Baja, Puerto Rico on December 14, 2019.

IWA Christmas in PR 2021
The event was not held in 2020, since government protocols prevented large gatherings and most of the professional wrestling promotions remained in hibernation. In its return, Christmas in PR 2021 was held at the Emilio Huyke Coliseum of Humacao, Puerto Rico on December 11, 2021. The card was bolstered by wrestlers brought in by the talent exchange between IWA-PR and Major League Wrestling (MLW), among them Danny Limelight of 5150.

See also

Professional wrestling in Puerto Rico
List of professional wrestling promotions

References

1999 in professional wrestling
Professional wrestling shows
Events in Puerto Rico
Recurring events established in 1999
Recurring events disestablished in 2006
Professional wrestling in Puerto Rico